The 1983–84 Arizona Wildcats men's basketball team represented the University of Arizona during the 1983–84 NCAA Division I men's basketball season. The team was led by new head coach Lute Olson, hired in March after nine seasons at Iowa.

The Wildcats played their home games on campus at the McKale Center in Tucson, and were a member of the Pacific-10 Conference. In the only season under Olson in which the Wildcats missed the NCAA tournament, Arizona finished with an overall record of 11–17 (8–10 in Pac-10, tied for fifth).

Roster

Schedule and results

|-
!colspan=12 style=| Non-conference regular season

|-
!colspan=12 style=| Pac-10 regular season

Sources

References

Arizona
Arizona Wildcats men's basketball seasons
Arizona Wildcats men's basketball team
Arizona Wildcats men's basketball team